Kalanchoe porphyrocalyx is a species of Kalanchoe native to Madagascar.

Many cultivars have been derived from K. porphyrocalyx. 'Wendy' is a multiflorous cultivar with 15-30 flowers in an inflorescence, which originated from hybridization between K. miniata and K. porphyrocalyx.

References 

porphyrocalyx